Osmoderma is a genus of beetle in family Scarabaeidae. It contains the following species:
 Osmoderma barnabita
 Osmoderma brevipenne
 Osmoderma caeleste
 Osmoderma coriarium
 Osmoderma cristinae
 Osmoderma dallieri
 Osmoderma davidis
 Osmoderma eremicola
 Osmoderma eremita – hermit beetle
 Osmoderma italicum
 Osmoderma lassallei
 Osmoderma opicum
 Osmoderma richteri
 Osmoderma scabrum
 Osmoderma sikhotense
 Osmoderma subplanatum

Cetoniinae
Scarabaeidae genera
Taxonomy articles created by Polbot